Parornix ampliatella is a moth of the family Gracillariidae. It is known from Austria, Croatia, Corsica and Italy.

References

Parornix
Moths of Europe
Moths described in 1850